San Secondo is a small deserted island located in the Venetian Lagoon, northern Italy.

History
In 1034 the Baffo family built a church and a convent for Benedictine nuns, with the task to keep a holy image of St. Erasmus. The current name dates to 1237, when the relics of St. Secundus were brought here from Asti. In 1533 the Benedictines were replaced by Dominicans and in 1566 it became a lazzaretto. Starting from 1569, after a fire in the Venetian arsenal, the Republic of Venice moved a powder store here.

In 1806 the Dominicans were expelled in the wake of the Napoleonic conquest of Venice. In 1824, all the buildings on the island were demolished and it was occupied by a military garrison. Today the island is completely deserted, and only the small ruins of a redoubt may still be seen.

References

Geography of Venice
Islands of the Venetian Lagoon